Hammonds Plains—Upper Sackville is a former provincial electoral district in Nova Scotia, Canada which existed from 2003 to 2013.  It elected one member of the Nova Scotia House of Assembly.  In its last configuration, the electoral district included those communities comprising the western suburbs of the Halifax Regional Municipality, namely Hammonds Plains, Yankeetown, Pockwock, Upper Sackville and Lucasville.

The electoral district was created in 2003, drawing parts of the electoral districts of Sackville-Beaver Bank (now defunct) and Timberlea-Prospect.  The electoral district was abolished following the 2012 electoral boundary review and was largely replaced by the new electoral district of Hammonds Plains-Lucasville.

Members of the Legislative Assembly
The electoral district was represented by the following Members of the Legislative Assembly:

Election results

2003 general election

2006 general election

2009 general election

External links
Riding profile - Nova Scotia Votes 2006 (CBC)
2006 Poll by Poll Results
Riding profile - Nova Scotia Votes 2003 (CBC)
2003 Poll by Poll Results

Former provincial electoral districts of Nova Scotia
Politics of Halifax, Nova Scotia